, also known by the pen name , is a Japanese manga artist. She is associated with the Year 24 Group.

Biography
Sasaya was born on January 31, 1950, in Ashibetsu, Sorachi Subprefecture, Hokkaido, as the youngest in a family of four children. Despite the wishes of her father, who wanted his four children to become teachers, she chose to pursue a career as a manga artist. At the age of 20, she began working in the manga magazine Ribon, where she became known for her horror stories with occult themes. Sasaya became associated with the Year 24 Group, a number of female manga artists who emerged in the 1970s and are noted for their innovation of shōjo manga (girls' comics).

In 1990, Sasaya won the Excellence Prize at the 19th Japan Cartoonists Association Award for her manga series , an autobiographical manga about her life with her husband. In 1994, after reading , a book about child abuse by journalist Atsuko Shiina（椎名 篤子）, she adapted the book into the manga . The manga, which was serialized in the manga magazine You in 1996, is credited with influencing the adoption of new child abuse laws in Japan on May 24, 2000, and it received the Avon Educational Award in 2004.

In 1996, she changed her pen name to "Nanaeko Sasaya". In 2017, she was a lecturer in the Faculty of Manga at Kyoto Seika University.

References

1950 births
Japanese female comics artists
Living people
Women manga artists
Female comics writers
Manga artists from Hokkaido